Dittwar is a district of Tauberbischofsheim with 693 residents.

Geography

Location
Dittwar is located south-west of Tauberbischofsheim in the Tauberfranken region of Franconia.

District
Dittwar is one of seven districts of Tauberbischofsheim. The other districts are the town of Tauberbischofsheim, as well as Dienstadt, Distelhausen, Dittigheim, Hochhausen and Impfingen.
Dittwar was incorporated to Tauberbischofsheim during the local government reform in Baden-Württemberg on January 1, 1975.

History

History of the village
Dittwar was first mentioned in 1100 as Ditebure (dit (mhd) = people / common / usually; bure (mhd) = farmer / neighbour). The name evolved to Dydebuor in 1343, Dytbuer in 1368, Dietbur in 1371, Dytewure in 1383, Dietwar in 1407, and finally Dittwar in 1615. The first mention Dittwar is related to the donation of the Castrum Dietebure by Count Henricus de Luden to the Prince-Bishop of Würzburg.

Coat of arms
The coat of arms of Dittwar show a bunch of grapes and a plough iron, both derived from the old seal of the village. The oldest known seal of the village dates from 1768 and shows a crowned wheel, flanked by the grapes and plough. The wheel is the symbol of the State of Mainz, to which the village belonged from medieval times until 1803. In the 19th century the village used a seal with a shield showing only the wheel. As the wheel is very common, it was decided to use the typical village symbols of the 18th century seal in the new arms.

Culture

Church and chapel
The baroque church of St. Lawrence dating back to 1753. Pilgrimages to the "Kreuzhölzle" have taken place since 1660. Inside the church, the chapel at "Kreuzhölzle" and in the village baroque portals and ornate shrines can be found.

Museum
In Dittwar there is a village-museum. It is a former farmhouse. In this farmhouse are housed flat, barn, cellar and stable in one building. In addition to exhibits from the period after 1900, a historic shoemaker's workshop is exhibited in a room.

Wayside shrines and crosses
There are more than 30 wayside shrines and crosses in the area of Dittwar.

People from Dittwar
 Franz Heffner (born 17th century–c. 1700), Premonstratensian in the monastery Oberzell, theologian and preacher
 Gottfried Hammerich (c. 1630–1710), Abbot of the monastery Obernzell
 Franz Callenbach (1663–1743), satirical writer and Jesuit
 Günter Clauser (4 January 1923 – 12 July 1982), doctor, psychoanalyst and nonfiction author.

Further reading
 – veröffentlicht 1968, online verfügbar gemacht durch den Heimat- und Kulturverein Dittwar e. V. 
 Gehrig, Franz: Das Kreuzhölzle: Kapelle - Kreuzweg - Wallfahrt zu Dittwar; heute: Tauberbischofsheim-Dittwar, Katholische Pfarrgemeinde St. Laurentius Dittwar, 36 Seiten, Dittwar 1982.
 Walz, Rudi: Wallfahrt zum Kreuzhölzle Dittwar, Katholische Pfarrgemeinde St. Laurentius Dittwar, 6 Seiten, Dittwar 1984.
 Pfarrer Kleemann: Festschrift - Heimatbuch zum Jubiläum 300 Jahre Kreuzkapelle Dittwar, Pfarrgemeinde St. Laurentius Dittwar, StieberDruck GmbH, 186 Seiten, Lauda 1983 (veröffentlicht im Rahmen des Dittwarer Heimatfestes am 9., 10. und 11. September 1983).
 Link, Wolfgang; Lotter, Erwin; Walz, Rudi: 1923 - 1983. 60 Jahre Musik- und Feuerwehrkapelle Dittwar: Jubiäumsfest 16.-20. Juni 1983 verbunden mit dem Verbandsmusikfest Odenwald-Bauland, Broschiert, Dittwar 1983.
 Hauenstein, Armin: Örtliches Entwicklungskonzept Tauberbischofsheim-Dittwar: Fortschreibung und Dokumentation der 1. Phase der Dorfentwicklung, Stadt Tauberbischofsheim, 35 Seiten, Tauberbischofsheim 1987.
 Hammerich, Reinhold: Festschrift und Chronik : 125 Jahre Gesangverein Liederkranz Dittwar 1864 e. V., Jubiläumsfest vom 25. bis 29. Mai 1989. Dittwar 1989.
 75 Jahre Musik- und Feuerwehrkapelle Dittwar und 50 jahre Freiwillige Feuerwehr Dittwar, Musik- und Feuerwehrkapelle Dittwar, Freiwillige Feuerwehr Dittwar, 80 Seiten, Dittwar 1998.
 Trumfheller, Manela; Reiß, Stefan: Geologische Kartierung des Bereiches Gissigheim - Dittwar - Heckfeld (Teilausschnitt der GK 25 Blatt Ahorn 6423), 26 Seiten, 1999.

References

External links

 Photos of Dittwar.
 Dittwar - location & others , chronicle and information collection (in German).

Villages in Baden-Württemberg
Main-Tauber-Kreis